Terminal 3 station can refer to:
Terminal 3 station (Beijing Subway), a subway station on Capital Airport Express of Beijing Subway. Located in Beijing, China.
Terminal 3 station (Zhengzhou Metro), an unopened station on Chengjiao Line of Zhengzhou Metro. Located in Zhengzhou, Henan Province, China.
Toronto Pearson Terminal 3 station, in Toronto, Canada.